Dollard is a masculine given name and a Canadian surname.  People with the name Dollard include:

Given name
 Dollard Ménard, a Canadian general
 Dollard St. Laurent, a retired Canadian ice hockey defenceman

Surname
 Adam Dollard des Ormeaux, a colonist and soldier of New France
 Edmund Dollard, Syracuse University men's basketball coach
John Dollard, American psychologist
 Pat Dollard, an American documentary filmmaker
 Robert Dollard, the first attorney general of South Dakota
 William Dollard, a Canadian Roman Catholic priest and Bishop of Saint John

Surnames
Masculine given names